A fixture can refer to:
 Test fixture, used to control and automate testing
 Light fixture
 Plumbing fixture
 Fixture (tool), a tool used in manufacturing
 Fixture (property law)
 A type of sporting event

See also
 
 
 Fixed (disambiguation)